Bundler can refer to:

Bundler (campaigning)
Bundler (strapping), another name for a strapping machine

See also 
 webpack, module bundler